Martha Thomas may refer to:

M. Carey Thomas (1857–1935), American educator, suffragist, and linguist
Martha Thomas Fitzgerald (1894–1981), American educator and politician
Martha Thomas (footballer) (born 1996), Scottish footballer
Martha Nelson Thomas, American folk artist
Martha J. B. Thomas, American chemical engineer and analytical chemist